"Are You That Somebody?" is a song recorded by American singer Aaliyah for the Dr. Dolittle soundtrack (1998). It was co-written and composed by Static Major–who also sang backing vocals–and Timbaland, who, in addition to writing the song, produced it and performed a guest rap. The song was sent to urban contemporary radio stations in the United States on May 26, 1998.

"Are You That Somebody?" was a commercial success, reaching number 21 on the US Billboard Hot 100, number 11 in the United Kingdom, number three in the Netherlands, and number one in New Zealand. Critically acclaimed, the song earned Aaliyah a Grammy Award nomination for Best Female R&B Vocal Performance.

Recording and production
According to a Static Major in an interview for Vibe, when Timbaland first presented the song to Aaliyah, she initially showed disdain for it. However, she eventually agreed to record it. In a behind-the-scenes video featuring Timbaland, he reveals that the song was recorded in a couple of hours after a show and that it was almost scrapped. 

"Are You That Somebody?" was recorded at the Capitol Studios in Los Angeles and, according to engineer Jimmy Douglass, the recording session for the song was "a soup-to-nuts session", meaning that the entire song was recorded and mixed in one session. The group worked on the song from 11:00 p.m. to 9:00 a.m. and the last portions that were added to the song were the baby noises and Timbaland's ad-libs.

Music and lyrics
Musically, "Are You That Somebody?" is an R&B, pop, and avant-funk song.  Journalist Larry Flick from Billboard, felt that Aaliyah had returned to her Funk/Hip hop roots on the record. In addition, the song also has a Neotango rhythm with Aaliyah displaying "coy vocals". Its production features a variety of sounds, such as frenetic staccato guitars, beatboxing, and drum and bass courtesy of drum programming. Flick described the guitar riff as, "jiggly", and that it gives "the track the feel good vibe of a '70s-era throw down". Other sounds that are utilized within the instrumental is a sample of a baby crying and laughing, taken from producer Jac Holzman's 1964 track "Happy Baby" from Authentic Sound Effects Volume 8. On “Are You That Somebody?” Aaliyah has a "no-nonsense delivery, along with  popping syncopation, a playfully funky bassline and that brilliantly bizarre baby chirp". 

Lyrically, "Are You That Somebody?" is about "a late-night rendezvous with a special someone that needed to be kept on the hush". On the song, Aaliyah issues a "will you still love me tomorrow sentiment". Her, "sweet but street" persona is in full effect, as she declares: "Sometimes I'm goody-goody / Right now I'm naughty naughty." There's also a sense of longing in the appearance of the song's title ("'Cause I really need somebody / Tell me are you that somebody") and in the way Aaliyah performed it, stretching out the syllables to the point of desperation and then keeping up with the beat with "hurried, jumbled phrasings".

Critical reception
Larry Flick from Billboard felt that Aaliyah was on her way towards becoming "the New Queen of soundtrack hits" because of "Are You That Somebody?". Flick also praised the song for its smooth melody and clever lyrics, saying: "At the same time it has a smooth melody and clever lyrics that will connect with folks who require traditional structure in their pop music." In its album guide, Rolling Stone commented that the song "remains one of '90s' R&B's most astounding moments." In 1999, Spin included the song on their top 20 singles list and they felt that Aaliyah's vocals and Timbaland's production on the song was like "an R&B singin in the rain". Damien Scott from Complex felt that "Are You That Somebody?" perfectly captured multiple traits found on Aaliyah's first two albums. According to Scott, "Aaliyah's oeuvre was an exercise in self-awareness. Her first two albums carefully toed the line between adolescence and adulthood, displaying a woman exploring the terrain of love, trust, and lust; one who exuded a playful innocence while hinting at a more sultry side. Her crowning achievement, a collaboration between her, Timbaland, and Static Major, 'Are You That Somebody,' would capture all of that perfectly". Quentin B. Huff from PopMatters feels that the song "is just too good to be relegated to soundtrack status". He continued praising the song by saying: "It's a fantastic track, with a stomping rhythm alternatingly accented by the strangest bundle of noise. It sounds like someone shaking dice or cracking their knuckles or twisting a Rubik's Cube really fast -- I can never decide which". In 2021, Billboard and Complex ranked the song at number two and number one, respectively, on their lists of the greatest Aaliyah songs. In a retrospective review, Billboard felt that "The goofy AF 1998 Eddie Murphy remake of the 1967 box office bomb Dr. Dolittle did not deserve one of the absolute greatest R&B jams of the ‘90s". Overall, they declared the song as defining the late ‘90s, and continuing "to chart a course for the future".

Accolades

Commercial performance
"Are You That Somebody?" wasn't released commercially to retail stores in the United States, therefore the song's chart success depended solely on radio airplay. During its chart run, Billboard changed its policy to allow airplay-only singles to chart on the Billboard Hot 100, starting with the chart issued December 5, 1998. Prior to this, "Are You That Somebody?" was eligible to enter only airplay charts in the US, peaking at number four on the Radio Songs chart on October 10. In August, the song peaked atop both the R&B/Hip-Hop Airplay and Rhythmic charts, 
 while in November, it peaked at number six on the Mainstream Top 40 chart. On December 5, the song debuted and peaked at number 21 on the Billboard Hot 100. In Canada, the song peaked at number 11, as well as reaching number two on the urban chart on August 31, 1998.
 
Internationally, "Are You That Somebody?" peaked at number 40 on the Ultratop 50 Wallonia chart in Belgium.
 In Germany, the song entered the singles chart at number 91 on November 9, 1998 and peaked at number 31 on January 25, 1999. In the Netherlands, the song entered the Single Top 100 chart at number 65 on October 17 and peaked at number three on November 14, 1998, the position in which it remained at for a total of three weeks; it also peaked at number three on the Dutch Top 40 for a total of three weeks. In the United Kingdom, the song peaked at number 11 on the UK Singles Chart on September 12, 1998. The song also peaked within the top five on the UK R&B and dance charts at numbers two and four, respectively. According to the Official Charts Company (OCC), "Are You That Somebody?" is Aaliyah's third best-selling single in the country. In New Zealand, the song debuted at number 43 on October 4, 1998 and peaked atop the singles chart the following week.

Music video

Synopsis
The music video for "Are You That Somebody?" was directed by Mark Gerard, with choreography by Fatima Robinson. It begins with Timbaland and a crew of men riding motorcycles to a cave where Aaliyah and other women are waiting. As Timbaland and the crew arrive, a hologram of a metal door seals the opening of the cave. The men notice that the seal is a hologram and drive through it. Inside the cave, clips of Dr. Dolittle are projected on several walls in the background. As Aaliyah's first verse starts, she holds a large bird on her arm and everyone begins to perform the choreography. There are scenes with just the women dancing, just the men dancing, both the women and men dancing, and Aaliyah performing alone. The group Playa makes an appearance in the background. The video ends with Aaliyah and the dancers performing a flamenco dance.

Fashion
Styling wise Aaliyah wore a Gucci bathing suit according to her former stylist Derek Lee. Lee spoke on her choice of clothing for the video with Complex saying, "No. It wasn’t a lot for them because it was $4,000 Gucci bathing suit. It was expensive so yeah, she wanted to show it. And that green look that she was wearing was all Girbaud. The skirt was a Gucci knockoff. I had someone make that and then just add a bit of flair to it". In an interview with Nylon, Lee further explained that the bathing suit was embedded with hand done blood-red Swarovski crystals. In the final scene of the video Aaliyah is wearing a customer made high-slit skirt.  Lee wanted her final look for the big dance scene to have a push in terms of her style. "I had it custom-done for her, too. It kind of bit off of the Gucci design and added some other stuff to it. [Choreographer] Fatima was like, 'You have to do that. You have to do the heels, you have to do this. It's time. It would be hot at the end, for you to flip [your outfit] because no one's ever seen you do this", says Lee.

Reception
During its chart run, the music video for "Are You That Somebody?" received heavy television airplay on multiple networks. For the week ending July 5, 1998, the video was the second most-played video on BET. For the week ending July 12, 1998, the video was the most played video on The Box. Between September 20–27, 1998, the video was the most played video on MTV. The video was featured on Complexs "The Best R&B Videos of the '90s" list; editor Ernest Baker praised the video by saying Aaliyah's clothing and choreography in the video were "revolutionary and groundbreaking". Vh1 recognized "Are You That Somebody?" in their list of Best R&B Music Video Choreography of the 1990s and 2000s.

Legacy
In March 2007, American indie rock band, Gossip, covered the song on BBC 6 Music.  A full studio version was leaked in 2009 and later released on the Ministry of Sound Volume 2 compilation in 2010. In 2009, Canadian rapper Drake interpolated a portion of the song's chorus in his verse on Young Money Entertainment's "BedRock": "Girl I gotta watch my back, 'cause I'm not just anybody." In 2011, a cover with a rap verse by Wax was recorded by The Red Ribbon Army.

Samples from the song have been used in numerous electronic, and, most recently, dubstep tracks. A prominent use of the sample was by James Blake on the track "CMYK" from his 2010 EP of the same name. In 2014, singer Banks performed an acoustic version of this song on BBC Radio 1's Live Lounge. In 2018, American a cappella group Pentatonix recorded the song as a medley combined with "New Rules" by Dua Lipa for their album PTX Presents: Top Pop, Vol. I.

In August 2021, it was reported that Aaliyah's recorded work for Blackground (since rebranded as Blackground Records 2.0) would be re-released on physical, digital, and, for the first time ever, streaming services in a deal between the label and Empire Distribution. "Are You That Somebody?" was re-released on September 3, 2021.

Track listings and formatsUK CD, 12-inch, and cassette single "Are You That Somebody?" (album version) – 4:27
 "Are You That Somebody?" (instrumental) – 4:26
 "Are You That Somebody?" (a cappella) – 4:26European CD single'
 "Are You That Somebody?" (album version) – 4:27
 "Are You That Somebody?" (a cappella) – 4:27

Charts

Weekly charts

Year-end charts

Certifications

Release history

See also
 List of number-one singles from the 1990s (New Zealand)
 List of artists who reached number one on the U.S. Rhythmic chart
 Rolling Stones 500 Greatest Songs of All Time

References

Bibliography

External links

Official website

1998 singles
1998 songs
Aaliyah songs
Funk songs
Number-one singles in New Zealand
Song recordings produced by Timbaland
Songs written by Static Major
Songs written by Timbaland
Songs written for films
Timbaland songs